The Jamaica national rugby sevens team participates in several international competitions. As champions of the 2017 RAN Sevens, they are the first ever Caribbean side to qualify for the 2018 Rugby World Cup Sevens and also participated in the 2018 Commonwealth Games. They have previously featured in Hong Kong Sevens World Series qualifying tournaments of 2013, 2017 and 2018.

Jamaica participated in the 2020 Men's Rugby Sevens Final Olympic Qualification Tournament in Monaco but did not qualify for the Tokyo Olympics. They won the 2021 RAN Sevens and qualified for the 2022 World Rugby Sevens Challenger Series.

Tournament history

Rugby World Cup Sevens

Commonwealth Games

Pan American Games

Rugby Americas North Sevens

References

National rugby sevens teams
Rugby union in Jamaica
R